Giulia Rubini (born 2 June 1935) is an Italian actress. She appeared in 35 films between 1953 and 1968. She starred in the film The Window to Luna Park, which was entered into the 7th Berlin International Film Festival.

Selected filmography

 Le ragazze di San Frediano (1954)
 High School (1954)
 The Two Friends (1955)
 Le signorine dello 04 (1955)
 The Virtuous Bigamist (1956)
 The Band of Honest Men (1956)
 The Window to Luna Park (1957)
 Beneath the Palms on the Blue Sea (1957)
 Peppino, le modelle e chella là (1957)
 Goliath and the Barbarians (1959)
The Night They Killed Rasputin (1960)
 David and Goliath (1960)
  (1961)
 Rage of the Buccaneers (1961)
 La monaca di Monza (1962)
 The Sign of the Coyote (1963)
 Kidnapped to Mystery Island (1964)
 Canadian Wilderness (1965)
 Johnny Oro (1966)
 7 pistole per un massacro (1967)
 A Stranger in Paso Bravo (1968)

References

External links

1935 births
Living people
Italian film actresses
People from Pescara
20th-century Italian actresses